Elias Mathope Motsoaledi (26 July 1924 – 9 May 1994) was a South African anti-apartheid activist and one of the eight men sentenced to life imprisonment at the Rivonia Trial in July 1963 and paternal uncle to South African politician and minister Aaron Motsoaledi. The Elias Motsoaledi Local Municipality in Limpopo province was named after him.

Early life

Elias Motsoaledi was born on 26 July 1924, the third of eight children, in Phokoane in the Nebo District in Sekhukuneland, now Limpopo. He moved to Johannesburg at the age of 17 in search of work. His first brush with the law in Johannesburg was his arrest for failure to produce his pass book – he was sentenced to work on the construction of a road in Pretoria. Upon his release he got a job in a furniture factory. He married Caroline Motsoaledi and they had seven children.

Role in Trade Union movement

Motsoaledi joined the Communist Party of South Africa (CPSA) in 1945 and then the African National Congress (ANC) in 1948. He soon became involved with trade unions. He joined the Leather Workers' Union in 1949, served as chairman of the Committee of Non-European Trade Unions (CNETU), which was formed in 1941. He was elected chairperson of CNETU in 1953. later played an active role in the establishment of the South African Congress of Trade Unions (COSATU).

Role in ANC and SACP

A lifelong member of the South African Communist Party and the ANC, he played a central role in many campaigns, including the Defiance Campaign of 1952, the year he was first banned. He joined the ANC in 1948, and in June he was elected as a branch secretary. Detained during the 1960 State of Emergency, he was imprisoned for four months. When he was released, he went underground and worked for Umkhonto we Sizwe by joining it in 1962. After 26 years on Robben Island, Motsoaledi was released from prison on 15 October 1989 along with five others. During the July 1991 National Conference, Motsoaledi was elected to the National Executive Committee (NEC) of the ANC.
 
He died on the 9 May 1994, the day before Nelson Mandela was inaugurated as the President of South Africa.

At Elias Mostoaledi’s funeral, Nelson Mandela summed it up in his speech as follows: "We began our political careers as members of the ANCYL and comrade Motsoaledi was a member of the Communist Party of SA as it was then known. As the YL we were fiercely nationalistic in our approach and anti-White, anti-Indian and anti-Communist. We had many clashes in which he criticized us and at times attacked us viciously for what he considered very conservative and reactionary views.

"But in that debate we learnt a great deal because when you debate issues of that nature if you approach that debate with seriousness and earnesty. At the end of the debate you find yourself closer to your rivals than you were before that debate.

"Even during that time when we accepted the Communist Party of SA was committed to the very ideas to which the ANC and Democratic Movement in this country was fighting was established to achieve, Cde Motsoaledi was one of those members of the Democratic Movement who was non-conformist.  He did not find it easy to agree with ideas unless he has considered them seriously and carefully.  Comrades and friends, that has been and still is the strength of our movement."

Motsoaledi received an Isitwalandwe Medal on 8 January 1992 along with Oliver Tambo, Nelson Mandela, Walter Sisulu, Helen Joseph, Ahmed Kathrada, Harry Gwala, Andrew Mlangeni, Raymond Mhlaba, and Wilton Mkwayi.

External links 
Elias Motsoaledi Profile.

References

1924 births
1994 deaths
People from Makhuduthamaga Local Municipality
Northern Sotho people
South African Communist Party politicians
African National Congress politicians
Anti-apartheid activists
South African trade unionists
South African revolutionaries
South African prisoners sentenced to life imprisonment
Prisoners sentenced to life imprisonment by South Africa
Inmates of Robben Island